Silas Matteson Weaver (December 18, 1843 – November 6, 1923) was a justice of the Iowa Supreme Court from January 1, 1902, to November 6, 1923, appointed from Hardin County, Iowa.

Biography
Silas M. Weaver was born in Arkwright, New York on December 18, 1843. He attended Fredonia Academy, read law, and was admitted to the bar in Buffalo on May 4, 1868. The same year, he moved to Iowa Falls, Iowa. There, he practiced law and edited newspapers such as the Sentinel and Hardin County Citizen He also served as the city's mayor for two years.

A Republican, he was a member of the Iowa House of Representatives from 1884 to 1886. He was elected to the state Supreme Court in 1902, and remained on the bench until his death. He was chief justice in 1907 and 1913.

Silas M. Weaver died at his home in Iowa Falls on November 6, 1923.

References

External links
State Historical Society of Iowa, Silas M. Weaver

1843 births
1923 deaths
Justices of the Iowa Supreme Court
Mayors of places in Iowa
Republican Party members of the Iowa House of Representatives
People from Chautauqua County, New York
State University of New York at Fredonia alumni